Astrolabe Bay Rural LLG is a local-level government (LLG) of Madang Province, Papua New Guinea.

Wards
01. Kul (Siroi language speakers)
02. Bangri
03. Bang (Sam language speakers)
04. Bongu
05. Boram
06. Male
07. Lalok
08. Kulel
09. Saipa
10. Bom
11. Jamjam
12. Kwato
13. Erima
14. Ato
15. Ileg

References

Local-level governments of Madang Province